The Academy of Sciences and Arts of Kosovo is the national academy of Kosovo.

History & Organization 
The Academy of Sciences and Arts of Kosovo was founded on December 20, 1975, by decision of the Assembly of Kosovo. Its first president was Esad Mekuli, who is considered to be the father of modern Albanian poetry in Yugoslavia. The academy is organized in four divisions. Those include the division of linguistics and literature, the division of social sciences, the division of natural sciences and the division of arts.

Members 

The academy has 24 regular and 11 associate members. The current president of the academy is Hivzi Islami, while the vice-president is Pajazit Nushi. Isuf Krasniqi is the general secretary of the academy. The heads of the divisions include Eqrem Basha, Jusuf Bajraktari, Fejzullah Krasniqi and Luan Mulliqi. Honorary members include personalities like Albanian-American Nobel prize winner Ferid Murad and Mother Teresa.

Annotations

References

Organizations established in 1975
Universities and colleges in Kosovo
Buildings and structures in Pristina
Education in Pristina
Albanian studies
Academy of Sciences and Arts of Kosovo